The Second Battle of the Aisne ( or , 16 April – mid-May 1917) was the main part of the Nivelle Offensive, a Franco-British attempt to inflict a decisive defeat on the German armies in France. The Entente strategy was to conduct offensives from north to south, beginning with an attack by the British Expeditionary Force (BEF) then the main attack by two French army groups on the Aisne. General Robert Nivelle planned the offensive in December 1916, after he replaced Joseph Joffre as Commander-in-Chief of the French Army.

When the French armies met the British advancing from the Arras front, the Germans would be pursued towards Belgium and the German frontier. The offensive began on 9 April, when the British began the Battle of Arras.

The Chemin des Dames ridge had been quarried for stone for centuries, leaving a warren of caves and tunnels which were used as shelters by German troops to escape the French bombardment. The offensive met massed German machine-gun and artillery fire, which inflicted many casualties and repulsed the French infantry at many points. The French achieved a substantial tactical success and took   prisoners but failed to defeat decisively the German armies. The failure had a traumatic effect on the morale of the French army and many divisions mutinied. Nivelle was superseded by General Philippe Pétain, who adopted a strategy of "healing and defence", to resume the wearing-out of the German Army while conserving French infantry. Pétain began a substantial programme re-equipment of the French Army, had  shot as scapegoats, provided better food, more pay and more leave, which led to a considerable improvement in morale.

The new French strategy was not one of passive defence; in June and July the Fourth, Sixth and Tenth Armies conducted several limited attacks and the First Army was sent to Flanders to participate in the Third Battle of Ypres. The British prolonged the Arras offensive into mid-May, despite uncertainty about French intentions, high losses and diminishing returns, as divisions were transferred northwards to Flanders. The British captured Messines Ridge on 7 June and spent the rest of the year on the offensive at Ypres and the Battle of Cambrai. The mutinies in the French armies became known to the Germans but the cost of the defensive success on the Aisne made it impossible to reinforce Flanders and conduct more than local operations on the Aisne and in Champagne. A French attack at Verdun in August completed the recapture of much of the ground lost in 1916. The Battle of La Malmaison in October captured the west end of the Chemin des Dames and forced the Germans to withdraw to the north bank of the Ailette.

Background

Strategic developments

Nivelle believed the Germans had been exhausted by the Battle of Verdun and the Battle of the Somme in 1916 and could not resist a breakthrough offensive, which could be completed in  The main attack on the Aisne would be preceded by a large diversionary attack by the British Third and First armies at Arras. The French War Minister, Hubert Lyautey and Chief of Staff General Philippe Pétain opposed the plan, believing it to be premature. The British Commander-in-Chief, Sir Douglas Haig, supported the concept of a decisive battle but insisted that if the first two phases of the Nivelle scheme were unsuccessful, the British effort would be moved north to Flanders. Nivelle threatened to resign if the offensive did not go ahead and having not lost a battle, had the enthusiastic support of the British Prime Minister David Lloyd George. The French Prime Minister Aristide Briand supported Nivelle but the war minister Lyautey resigned during a dispute with the Chamber of Deputies and the Briand government fell; a new government under Alexandre Ribot took office on 20 March.

The plan of December 1916 was plagued by delays and information leaks. By the time the offensive began in April 1917, the Germans had received intelligence of the Allied plan and strengthened their defences on the Aisne front. By late March, GAN had been reduced by eleven infantry, two cavalry divisions and  guns, which went into the French strategic reserve.

Tactical developments

When Hindenburg and Ludendorff took over from Falkenhayn on 28 August 1916, the pressure being placed on the German army in France was so great that new defensive arrangements, based on the principles of depth, invisibility and immediate counter-action were formally adopted, as the only means by which the growing material strength of the French and British armies could be countered. Instead of fighting the defensive battle in the front line or from shell-hole positions near it, the main fight was to take place behind the front line, out of view and out of range of enemy field artillery. Conduct of the Defensive Battle was published on 1 December 1916. The new manual laid down the organisation for the mobile defence of an area, rather than the rigid defence of a trench line. Positions necessary for the new method were defined in Principles of Field Position Construction.

Experience of the German First Army in the Somme Battles, was published on 30 January 1917. Towards the end of the Battle of the Somme in 1916, Colonel Fritz von Loßberg (Chief of Staff of the 1st Army) had been able to establish a line of relief divisions. In his analysis of the battle, Loßberg opposed the granting of discretion to front trench garrisons to retire, as he believed that manoeuvre did not allow the garrisons to evade Allied artillery-fire, which could blanket the forward area and invited enemy infantry to occupy vacated areas unopposed. Loßberg considered that spontaneous withdrawals would disrupt the counter-attack reserves as they deployed and further deprive battalion and division commanders of the ability to conduct an organised defence, which the dispersal of infantry over a wider area had already made difficult. Loßberg and other officers had severe doubts as to the ability of relief divisions to arrive on the battlefield in time to conduct an immediate counter-attack from behind the battle zone and wanted the Somme practice of fighting in the front line to be retained and authority devolved no further than the battalion, so as to maintain organizational coherence, in anticipation of a methodical counter-attack after  by the relief divisions. Ludendorff was sufficiently impressed by the Loßberg memorandum to add it to the new Manual of Infantry Training for War.

Prelude

German defensive preparations

By April, the French advance had only progressed beyond Neuville-sur-Margival and Leuilly. On 1 April, a French attack along the line of the Ailette–Laon road reached the outskirts of Laffaux and Vauxaillon. Vauxeny and Vauxaillon were occupied a few days later.

Defensive battle

In a new manual of 1 December 1916,  (Principles of Command for Defensive Battle), the policy of unyielding defence of ground regardless of its tactical value, was replaced by the defence of positions suitable for artillery observation and communication with the rear, where an attacking force would "fight itself to a standstill and use up its resources while the defenders conserve[d] their strength". A  (rear battle zone) further back was to be occupied by the reserve battalion of each regiment.

Field fortification

"Principles of Field Fortification" was published in January 1917 and by April an outpost zone held by sentries, had been built along the Western Front. Defensive procedures in the battle zone were similar but with greater numbers of men. Such a decentralised battle by large numbers of small infantry detachments would present the attacker with unforeseen obstructions. Resistance from troops equipped with automatic weapons, supported by observed artillery fire, would increase the further the advance progressed. A school was opened in January 1917 to teach infantry commanders the new methods.

Such methods required large numbers of reserve divisions ready to move to the battlefront. The reserve was obtained by creating  by internal reorganisation of the army, bringing divisions from the eastern front and by shortening the western front, in Operation Alberich.

Battle

Third Army

The Third Army began French operations, with preliminary attacks on German observation points at St. Quentin on  Large reconnaissance forces were sent towards the Dallon spur on 1 April, which were not able to gain footholds in the German front defences, although the British Fourth Army to the north captured the woods around Savy.

The French had attacked in intense cold and driving rain, with chronic supply shortages caused by the German destruction of roads and immense French traffic jams on the few supply routes which had been sufficiently repaired to bear traffic. East of the Oise and north of the Aisne, the Third Army took the southern and north-western outskirts of Laffaux and Vauxeny. On 4 April German counter-attacks north of the Aisne were repulsed south of Vauxeny and Laffaux. The French captured Moy on the west bank of the Oise, along with Urvillers and Grugies, a village opposite Dallon on the east bank of the Somme. North of the farm of La Folie, the Germans were pushed back; three  howitzers and several  lorries were captured. Beyond Dallon French patrols entered the south-western suburb of St. Quentin.

The main attack by GAN was planned as two successive operations, an attack by XIII Corps to capture Rocourt and Moulin de Tous Vents south-west of the city, to guard the flank of the principal attack by XIII Corps and XXXV Corps on Harly and Alaincourt, intended to capture the high ground east and south-east of St. Quentin. Success would enable the French to menace the flank of the German forces to the south, along the Oise to La Fère and the rear of the German positions south of the St. Gobain massif, due to be attacked from the south by the Sixth Army of the GAR. The French were inhibited from firing on St. Quentin, which allowed the Germans unhampered observation from the cathedral and from factory chimneys and to site artillery in the suburbs, free from counter-battery fire. French attacks could only take place at night or during twilight and snow, rain, low clouds and fog made aircraft observation for the artillery impossible.

The British Fourth Army was unable to assist the French with an attack due to a lack of divisions, after transfers north to the British Third Army but was able to assist with artillery-fire from the north and kept a cavalry division in readiness to join a pursuit. The French artillery had been reduced to  guns by transfers south to GAR, which was insufficient to bombard the German defences and conduct counter-batter fire simultaneously. On 13 April at  XIII Corps attacked with two divisions; the 26th Division on the right took the German first line and then defeated two German counter-attacks but the 25th Division on the left was held up almost immediately by uncut wire and machine-gun fire, despite French field artillery being advanced into no man's land at the last minute to cut the wire. Casualties in the thirteen attacking battalions were severe. The 25th Division was ordered by the army commander, General Humbert to attack again at  but the orders arrived too late and the attack did not take place. French aircraft were active over the attack front but at midday large formations of German fighters arrived and forced the French artillery-observation and reconnaissance aircraft back behind the front line. German artillery-fire had not been heavy and the defence had been based on machine-gun fire and rapid counter-attacks. The XIII Corps and XXXV Corps attack due next day was eventually cancelled.

Fifth and Sixth armies

From the beginning, German machine-gunners were able to engage the French infantry and inflict many casualties, although German artillery-fire was far less destructive. Courcy on the right flank was captured by the 1st Brigade of the Russian Expeditionary Force in France but the advance was stopped at the Aisne–Marne canal. The canal was crossed further north and Berméricourt was captured against a determined German defence. From Bermericourt to the Aisne the French attack was repulsed and south of the river French infantry were forced back to their start-line. On the north bank of the Aisne the French attack was more successful, the 42nd and 69th divisions reached the German second position between the Aisne and the Miette, the advance north of Berry penetrating .

Tanks to accompany the French infantry to the third objective arrived late and the troops were too exhausted and reduced by casualties to follow them. Half of the tanks were knocked out in the German defences and then acted as pillboxes in advance of the French infantry, which helped to defeat a big German counter-attack. German infantry launched hasty counter-attacks along the front, recaptured Bermericourt and conducted organised counter-attacks where the French infantry had advanced the furthest. At Sapigneul in the XXXII Corps area, the 37th Division attack failed, which released German artillery in the area to fire in enfilade into the flanks of the adjacent divisions, which had been able to advance and the guns were also able to engage the French tanks north of the Aisne. The defeat of the 37th Division restored the German defences between Loivre and Juvincourt.

The left flank division of the XXXII Corps and the right division of the V Corps penetrated the German second position south of Juvincourt but French tanks attacking south of the Miette from  advanced to disaster. German observers at Craonne, on the east end of the Chemin des Dames, were able to direct artillery-fire against the tanks and  destroyed behind the French front line; few of the tanks reached the German defences and by the evening only ten tanks were operational. On the Chemin des Dames, I Corps made very little progress and by evening had advanced no further than the German support line,  ahead. The French infantry had suffered many casualties and few of the leading divisions were capable of resuming the attack. The advance had failed to reach objectives which were to have fallen by  but  prisoners had been taken.

The VI Corps advanced its right flank west of the Oise–Aisne Canal but its left flank was held up. Laffaux was captured and then lost to a counter-attack before changing hands several times, until finally captured on 19 April. To the east of Vauxaillon, at the north end of the Sixth Army,  was captured with the help of British heavy artillery but then lost to a German counter-attack. The Sixth Army operations took approximately 3,500 prisoners but no break-through had been achieved and the German second position had been reached at only one point.

On the second day, Nivelle ordered the Fifth Army to attack north-eastwards to reinforce success, believing that the Germans intended to hold the ground in front of the Sixth Army. The German retirement was carried out in a rush and many guns were left behind, along withvast stocks of munitions.

Fourth Army

The "Monts" were held against a German counter-attack on 19 April by the 5th, 6th ( divisions), the 23rd division and one regiment between Nauroy and Moronvilliers. On the west bank the Moroccan Division was repulsed on the right and captured  on the left.

Tenth Army

Nivelle ordered the Tenth Army forward between the Fifth and Sixth armies on 21 April. The IX Corps and XVIII Corps took over between Craonne and Hurtebise and local operations were continued on the fronts of the Fourth and Fifth armies with little success. An attack on Brimont on  the capture of which would have been of great tactical value, was postponed on the orders of the French government and never took place. An attack on 5 May southeast of Vauxaillon took Moisy Farm and Laffaux Mill and repulsed German counter-attacks. Next day another advance was conducted north of the mill. German counter-attacks continued in constant attack and counter-attack in the Soissons sector. By the end of 5 May the Sixth Army had reached the outskirts of Allemant and took roughly 4,000 prisoners. The offensive continued on the Fourth Army front where  was captured and by 10 May  and  had been taken by the French armies.

German 7th Army counter-attacks

Between Vauxaillon and Reims and on the Moronvilliers heights the French had captured much of the German defensive zone, despite the failure to break through and Army Group German Crown Prince counter-attacked before the French could consolidate, mostly by night towards the summits of the Chemin des Dames and the Moronvilliers massif. During the nights of the  May, the Germans attacked from Vauxaillon to Craonne and on the night of  German attacks were repulsed at Cerny, La Bovelle, Heutebise Farm and the Californie Plateau. Next day, German counter-attacks on Chevreux, north-east of Craonne at the foot of the east end of the Chemin des Dames were defeated.

French attacks on 17 May took ground east of Craonne and on 18 May, German attacks on the Californie Plateau and on the Chemin des Dames just west of the Oise–Aisne Canal, were repulsed. On 20 May, a counter-offensive to retake the French positions from Craonne to the east of Fort de la Malmaison, was mostly defeated by artillery-fire and where German infantry were able to advance through the French defensive barrages, French infantry easily forced them back;  prisoners were taken. On 21 May, German surprise attacks on the Vauclerc Plateau failed and on the following evening, the French captured several of the remaining observation posts dominating the Ailette Valley and three German trench lines east of Chevreux. A German counter-attack on the Californie Plateau was smashed by artillery and infantry small-arms fire and  taken.

Battle of the Observatories

At  on 23 May, a German assault on the Vauclerc Plateau was defeated and on 24 May, a renewed attack was driven back in confusion. During the night the French took the wood south-east of Chevreux and almost annihilated two German battalions. On 25 May, three German columns attacked a salient north-west of Bray-en-Laonnois and gained a footing in the French first trench, before being forced out by a counter-attack. On 26 May German attacks on salients east and west of Cerny were repulsed and from  German attacks between Vauxaillon and Laffaux Mill broke down. On the morning of 1 June, after a heavy bombardment, German troops captured several trenches north of Laffaux Mill and lost them to counter-attacks in the afternoon. On 2 June a bigger German attack began, after an intensive bombardment of the French front, from the north of Laffaux to the east of Berry-au-Bac. On the night of  two German divisions made five attacks on the east, west and central parts of the Californie Plateau and the west end of the Vauclerc Plateau. The Germans attacked in waves, at certain points advancing shoulder-to-shoulder, supported by flame-thrower detachments and gained some ground on the Vauclerc Plateau, until French counter-attacks recovered the ground. Despite the French holding improvised defences and the huge volumes of German artillery-fire used to prepare attacks, the German organised counter-attacks met with little success and at Chevreux north-east of Craonne, the French had even pushed further into the Laon Plain.

Aftermath

Analysis

In 2015, Andrew Uffindell wrote that retrospective naming and dating of events can affect the way in which the past is understood.  The Second Battle of the Aisne began on 16 April but the duration and extent of the battle have been interpreted differently.  The ending of the battle is usually given as mid-May.  Uffindell called this politically convenient, since this excluded the Battle of La Malmaison in October, making it easier to heap blame upon Nivelle.  Uffindel wrote that the exclusion of La Malmaison was artificial, since the attack was begun from the ground taken from April to May. General Franchet d'Espèrey called La Malmaison "the decisive phase of the Battle… that began on 16 April and ended on 2 November…".

The operation had been planned as a decisive blow against the Germans; by 20 April it was clear that the strategic intent of the offensive had not been achieved and by 25 April most of the fighting had ended. Casualties had reached 20 per cent in the French armies by 10 May and some divisions suffered more than 60 per cent casualties. On 3 May, the French 2nd Division refused orders, similar refusals and mutiny spread through the armies; the Nivelle Offensive was abandoned in confusion on 9 May. The politicians and public were stunned by the chain of events and on 16 May, Nivelle was sacked and moved to North Africa. He was replaced by the considerably more cautious Pétain with Foch as chief of the General Staff, who adopted a strategy of "healing and defence" to avoid casualties and to restore morale. Pétain had  shot as examples and introduced reforms to improve the welfare of French troops, which did much to restore morale.

The operations in Champagne on 20 May ended the Nivelle Offensive; most of the Chemin-des-Dames plateau, particularly the east end, which dominated the plain north of the Aisne had been captured. Bois-des-Buttes, Ville-aux-Bois, Bois-des-Boches and the German first and second positions from there to the Aisne had also been captured.  South of the river, the Fifth and Tenth armies on the plain near Loivre, had managed to advance west of the Brimont Heights. East of Reims the Fourth Army had captured most of the Moronvilliers massif and Auberive, then advanced along the Suippe, which provided good jumping-off positions for a new offensive. The cost of the Nivelle Offensive in casualties and loss of morale were great but German losses were also high and the tactical success of the French, in capturing elaborately fortified positions and defeating counter-attacks, reduced German morale.  The Germans had been forced out of three of the most elaborately fortified positions on the Western Front and failed to recapture them. Vimy Ridge, the Scarpe Heights, the caverns, spurs and plateau of the Chemin des Dames and the Moronvilliers massif had been occupied for more than two years, carefully surveyed by German engineers and fortified to make them impregnable.  In six weeks all were lost and the Germans were left clinging to the eastern or northern edges of the ridges of the summits.

The French tactic of assault  suited the German defensive dispositions, since much of the new construction had taken place on reverse slopes. The speed of attack and the depth of the French objectives meant that there was no time to establish artillery observation posts overlooking the Ailette valley, in the areas where French infantry had reached the ridge. The tunnels and caves under the ridge nullified the destructive effect of the French artillery, which was also reduced by poor weather and by German air superiority, which made French artillery-observation aircraft even less effective. The rear edge of the German battle zone along the ridge had been reinforced with machine-gun posts and the German divisional commanders decided to hold the front line, rather than giving ground elastically; few of the Eingreif Divisions were needed to intervene in the battle.

Casualties

In 1939 G. C. Wynne wrote that the French had  casualties including  killed in the first few days but that the effect on military and civilian morale was worse than the casualties. In the 1939 volume of Der Weltkrieg, the German official historians recorded German losses to the end of June as  men including  missing and claimed French casualties of – men, including  taken prisoner. The advance of the Sixth Army was one of the largest made by a French army since trench warfare began.

Subsequent operations

The Battle of La Malmaison (led to the capture of the village and fort of La Malmaison and control of the Chemin des Dames ridge. Much of the German artillery was silenced before the French attack. Gas bombardments in the Ailette valley became so dense that the carriage of ammunition and supplies to the front was made impossible.

From  the XXI and XIV corps advanced rapidly and the I Cavalry Corps was brought forward into the XIV Corps area, in case the Germans collapsed. In four days the attack had advanced  and forced the Germans from the narrow plateau of the Chemin des Dames, back to the north bank of the Ailette Valley. The French took  prisoners,  and  mortars. French losses were  killed,  wounded and  missing from  10 per cent of the casualties of the attacks during the Nivelle Offensive.

Notes

Footnotes

References 

Books
 
 
 
 
 
 
 
 
 
 
 
 
 
 

Encyclopaedias
 
 

Websites

Further reading

External links 

 Chemin des Dames Portail official portal, multi-language
 Chemin des Dames Virtual Memorial searchable databases soldiers, regiments, battles, cemeteries, monuments and documents 
 La Caverne du Dragon museum of the 1917 battle at Chemin des Dames multimedia
 First World War: Chemin des Dames photos and descriptions, Chemin des Dames sites

Aisne 2
1917 in France
Aisne 2
Aisne 2
Aisne 2
the Aisne

fi:Aisnen toinen taistelu